Tryfan ) is a mountain in the Ogwen Valley, Snowdonia, Wales. It forms part of the Glyderau group, and is one of the most recognisable peaks in Britain, having a classic pointed shape with rugged crags. Tryfan was voted Britain's favourite mountain by Trail magazine.

However, it was resurveyed using accurate GPS measurements and found to be 2.4 metres (eight feet) higher (which the pre-1980s surveys also recorded).

Tryfan is said to be the final resting-place of Sir Bedivere (Bedwyr) of Arthurian legend.

Naming
The name "Tryfan" is thought to derive from the intensifying particle try– and the noun ban (‘top, peak’), giving the meaning ‘very high peak’.

Routes of ascent

There are many routes of ascent, ranging from easy ridge scrambling, to multi-pitch mountaineering rock climbs on the east face.

A popular ascent route is its north ridge, which starts close to the A5 road, about one mile (1.5 km) east of Idwal Cottage (a youth hostel) or Ogwen Cottage (an outdoor pursuits centre). From here a route leads directly up the ridge, a Grade 1 scramble by the easiest line. The difficulty can be increased considerably if the most direct line is followed throughout; particularly in the upper sections of the ridge. About a third of the way up there is a distinctive rock known as "The Cannon" which points upwards at 45 degrees and is visible from the valley. The North Tower is located three quarters of the way up, which can be avoided to the right or climbed directly at a difficulty of Grade 2.

Tryfan may also be climbed by the south ridge, which links the mountain (via Bristly Ridge) to Glyder Fach. The route begins at Bwlch Tryfan, the col between Tryfan and Bristly Ridge. The col is reached by a path leading up from Idwal Cottage to the west, passing through Cwm Bochlwyd.  This cwm contains Llyn Bochlwyd.

The summit of Tryfan is famous for the twin monoliths of Siôn a Siân (Adam and Eve in English), a pair of rocks some three metres (10') high and separated by 1.2 metres (4'). The rocks are visible from the Ogwen valley. Those who tackle the "step" between the two rocks are said to gain the "Freedom of Tryfan". However, the exposure on one side is quite great, and mountain writer Frank Showell Styles said: "In calm dry weather it is not too hard a step but the penalties of failure are unpleasant in the extreme."

Two prominent pillar-like boulders are visible on the skyline midway through the approach to the summit via the South ridge. As these can be mistaken for Siôn a Siân from a distance, they have become known as Cain and Abel, continuing the biblical theme.

Milestone Buttress
Milestone Buttress at the base of Tryfan is a popular location for climbing. The Buttress is about 10 minutes' walk from roadside laybys. The most popular route is known as the Direct Route: there are often queues of people waiting to climb it. The route was first climbed by G. Barlow and H. Priestly-Smith in  1910. There is also a popular Grade 3 scramble incorporating the Milestone Buttress. This route is commonly used as an alternative approach to the North Ridge, as is the nearby slabby wedge of Tryfan Bach, on the other side of the mountain.

Gallery

References

Bibliography

External links
 Computer generated summit panoramas North South index
 www.geograph.co.uk : photos of Tryfan and surrounding area
 

Hewitts of Wales
Marilyns of Wales
Mountains and hills of Snowdonia
Nuttalls
Sites of Special Scientific Interest in West Gwynedd
Mountains and hills of Conwy County Borough
Climbing areas of Wales
Furths
Capel Curig